Celestine Wasserfall (born 21 September 1984) is a retired Namibian football striker.

References

1984 births
Living people
Namibian men's footballers
Namibia international footballers
Chief Santos players
Blue Waters F.C. players
Orlando Pirates S.C. players
Association football forwards
People from Omaruru